The 1935 Australian Grand Prix was a motor race held at the Phillip Island circuit in Victoria, Australia on 1 April 1935. The 200 mile race was organised by the Light Car Club of Australia and was open to cars with an engine capacity not exceeding 2000cc. It was the eighth Australian Grand Prix and the last to be staged at the Phillip Island circuit.

Contested as a handicap race, it was won by Les Murphy, driving an MG P Type. Murphy started the race 29 minutes and 27 seconds ahead of the last starter, Bill Thompson, who finished second. Murphy's winning margin was 27 seconds. Thompson completed the race in the fastest actual time and set the fastest lap of the race.

Race classification 

The Team Prize was awarded to Lane's Motors which nominated Murphy, Thompson and McKay.

Key:
 DNF: Did not finish
 DNS: Did not start
 Handicap: The interval between the driver's designated start time and the start time of the scratch car.

Notes
 Race distance: 31 laps, 206 miles
 Race time limit: 3½ hours
 Winner's race time: 3 hours 10 minutes and 13 seconds (67.83 mph)
 Fastest time: 2 hours 33 minutes 28 seconds (80.53 mph) – Bill Thompson
 Fastest lap: 4 minutes 45 seconds (82.1 mph) – Bill Thompson

References

Grand Prix
Australian Grand Prix
Motorsport at Phillip Island
Australian Grand Prix